Charles Knox Robinson III (April 13, 1932 — July 22, 2006) was an American actor who appeared in over 80 films and television series over his career. From 1958 through 1971 he was credited as Charles Robinson and, from 1972 onward, his full birth name, Charles Knox Robinson, also became his stage name. His credits have been occasionally commingled with those of younger actor Charlie Robinson who, during an eight-year (1984–92) stint as court clerk Mac Robinson on Night Court had been credited as Charles Robinson.

Robinson's first on-screen billing in a feature film was as one of the title characters in 1962's The Interns. He established the Torchlight Project together with his wife, Joan, which aided, empowered and enriched the lives of impoverished children in foreign countries. He was also a member of many organizations including: the Academy of Motion Picture Arts and Sciences, Screen Actors Guild, American Federation of Television and Radio Artists, Actors' Equity Association, Playwrights/Dramatists Guild and the Academy of Magical Arts.

Biography
Born in the New Jersey township of Orange, he was the son of playwright Charles Knox Robinson II and painter Geraldine O'Loughlin. Siblings include Judith Kirby Robinson, actress, and Toni Stuart Robinson Thalenberg, former actress/academic.  He was the maternal cousin of actor Gerald S. O'Loughlin. His theatrical family opened his acting career at age three on Broadway.

Receiving his high school diploma from the private Lawrenceville School, he graduated Phi Beta Kappa and magna cum laude from Princeton University in 1954. He was an English major and had many campus activities, including serving as president of Triangle Club. After graduation, he served in the Army from 1958 to 1962 as an aide-de-camp to a general in the Pentagon, translator and speech writer, attaining the rank of first lieutenant. He also served as a French and Russian language interpreter for the 1984 Olympics.

He married Joan (who wrote under her birth name, Giovanna) Calistri on May 7, 1960, in New York City.

Career
Robinson had co-starring and supporting roles in more than 80 films and episodes of TV series during his career; his first film was Splendor in the Grass in the small uncredited role of Johnny Masterson. Some of Robinson's other film appearances include Take Her, She's Mine, Dear Brigitte, Shenandoah, and The Singing Nun. His many TV credits include 77 Sunset Strip, Alfred Hitchcock Presents, Stoney Burke, The Alfred Hitchcock Hour, Bachelor Father, Ripcord, Laramie, Wagon Train, Gunsmoke, The Virginian, The High Chaparral, Ben Casey, The Munsters, My Three Sons, Cade's County, The Sixth Sense, Mannix, Ironside, Banacek, The F.B.I., Barnaby Jones, Griff, O'Hara, U.S. Treasury, The Manhunter, The Six Million Dollar Man, Adam-12, Emergency!, Mobile One, The Paper Chase, Ellery Queen, Cannon, Flying High, The Hardy Boys/Nancy Drew Mysteries, Airwolf, Switch, Quincy, M.E., Simon & Simon, Finder of Lost Loves, Scarecrow & Mrs. King and The Equalizer. On Broadway he performed in Tall Story, The Pleasure of His Company and The Good Soup. The first two plays would later become motion pictures with other actors playing the roles he originated.

He was part of the great ensemble cast in Robert Wise's 1966 film The Sand Pebbles. Robinson played Richard Crenna's second in command Ensign Bordelles aboard the fictional Navy gunboat, USS San Pablo, stationed in China. Robinson had a standout scene in which he had to lead his troops under guard of Chinese Nationalist soldiers back to the ship. As the sailors march, they are pummeled by vegetables thrown by the throngs of Chinese citizens. It was one of nine theatrical features in which he appeared during the 1960s, in addition to 23 guest starring roles in TV series episodes.

The 1970s proved to be an even busier decade, with 5 theatrical features as well as 34 television films and episodes of TV series, including four additional installments of The F.B.I., a series which had already featured him in two 1960s episodes.

Fifty years old in 1982, Robinson had eleven screen credits in the 1980s, ten of which were in television films as well as episodes of TV series, with the last two airing in 1986 (February 5 episode of CBS' The Equalizer and June 6 episode of ABC's Comedy Factory, June 6). The eleventh role was in his sole theatrical feature of the decade, 1987's Death Wish 4: The Crackdown in which he played the small part of an unnamed newspaper editor. After a passage of nine years performing in local theater and other activity, he returned to the screen in 1996, at age 64, for one small final role, that of an unnamed lawyer for Matthew Broderick's character in the black comedy The Cable Guy, where he was billed 44th in the end credits as Charles Knox Robinson, III.

He appeared in the 2001 Palm Canyon Theatre Productions Arsenic and Old Lace and The Man Who Came to Dinner. His lifelong entertainment career included his talents as an award-winning playwright, singer, songwriter, musician, linguist and magician. He and his wife, Joan, established the Torchlight Project, which had as its purpose aiding, empowering, and enriching the lives of impoverished and abandoned children in many foreign countries. He was a member of the Academy of Motion Picture Arts and Sciences, Screen Actors Guild, American Federation of Television and Radio Artists, Actors' Equity Association, Playwrights/Dramatists Guild and the Academy of Magical Arts.

Death
Robinson died of Parkinson's disease at his Palm Springs home at the age of 74. He was interred at Ocean View Cemetery in Staten Island. His wife, Joan Calistri Robinson (1928–2001), had died five years earlier.

Filmography

References

External links
Charles Knox Robinson at British Film Institute
Charles Knox Robinson at AllMovie
as Charles Knox Robinson III at AllMovie

1932 births
2006 deaths
American male film actors
American male stage actors
American male television actors
People from Orange, New Jersey
20th-century American male actors
Neurological disease deaths in California
Deaths from Parkinson's disease